Sastre is a town (comuna) in the west of the province of Santa Fe, Argentina, 139 km west from the provincial capital.

It is named after Marcos Sastre, a renowned Argentine lawyer, writer, and educator. Miguel Brascó, the noted Argentine writer and food critic, hails from Sastre.

Twin towns — sister cities
Sastre is twinned with:

  Alba, Piedmont, Italy (1988)

References
 
 
 :es:Sastre y Ortiz (Santa Fe)

External links 
 Sastre's map

Populated places in Santa Fe Province